The 2016–17 FC Arsenal Tula season is the club's first season back in the Russian Premier League, the highest tier of association football in Russia, since relegation at the end of the 2014–15 season, and their 2nd in total. Arsenal Tula also reached the Russian Cup Round of 32, where they were eliminated by Tosno.

Squad

On Loan

Reserve squad
Reserve team players are registered with the Premier League and are eligible to play in any official games.

Transfers

Summer

In:

Out:

Winter

In:

Out:

Competitions

Russian Premier League

Results by round

Matches

League table

Relegation play-offs

Russian Cup

Squad statistics

Appearances and goals

|-
|colspan="14"|Players away from the club on loan:

|-
|colspan="14"|Players who left Arsenal Tula during the season:

|}

Goal scorers

Disciplinary record

References

External links
Official website 

FC Arsenal Tula seasons
Arsenal Tula